Sonzogni is a surname of Italian origin. Notable people with this surname include:

 Fabio Sonzogni (born 1963), Italian actor and director
 Giuliano Sonzogni (born 1949), Italian football manager
 Manuela Sonzogni (born 1985), Italian professional racing cyclist

See also 
 Edoardo Sonzogno (1836-1920), Italian publisher

it:Sonzogni